Ignacio Flores may refer to:

 Ignacio Flores (Mexican footballer) (1953–2011), Mexican football defender
 Ignacio Flores (Pacificator of Peru) (1733–1786)
 Ignacio Flores (Uruguayan footballer) (born 1990), Uruguayan football striker